The Book of Negroes is a document created by Brigadier General Samuel Birch, under the direction of Sir Guy Carleton, that records names and descriptions of 3,000 Black Loyalists, enslaved Africans who escaped to the British lines during the American Revolution and were evacuated to points in Nova Scotia as free people of colour.

Background
The first African person in Nova Scotia arrived with the founding of Port Royal in 1605. African people were then brought as slaves to Nova Scotia during the founding of Louisbourg and Halifax. The first major migration of African people to Nova Scotia happened during the American Revolution. Enslaved Africans in  America who escaped to the British during the American Revolutionary War became the first settlement of Black Nova Scotians and Black Canadians. Other Black Loyalists were transported to settlements in several islands in the West Indies and some to London. Recorded in 1783, this 150-page document is the only one to have recorded Black Canadians in a large, detailed scope of work.

Contents

 
The document contains records on 3000 Africans; the former slaves recorded in the Book of Negroes were evacuated to British North America, where they were settled in the newly established Birchtown and other places in the colony. According to the Treaty of Paris (1783), the United States argued for the return of all property, including slaves. The British refused to return the slaves, to whom they had promised freedom during the war for joining their cause. The detailed records were created to document the freed people whom the British resettled in Nova Scotia, along with other Loyalists. The book was assembled by Samuel Birch, the namesake of Birchtown, Nova Scotia, under the direction of Sir Guy Carleton.

Some freedmen later migrated from Nova Scotia to Sierra Leone, where they formed the original settlers of Freetown, under the auspices of the Sierra Leone Company. They are among the ancestors of the Sierra Leone Creole ethnic group.

Notable people recorded in the Book of Negroes include Boston King, Henry Washington, Moses Wilkinson and Cato Perkins.

As the Book of Negroes was recorded separately by American and British officers, there are two versions of the document. The British version is held in The National Archives in Kew, London The American version is held by the National Archives and Records Administration in Washington, D.C. It was published under the title The Black Loyalist Directory: African Americans in Exile After the American Revolution (1996), edited by Graham Russell Hodges, Susan Hawkes Cook, and Alan Edward Brown.

Representation in other media
The Canadian novelist Lawrence Hill wrote The Book of Negroes (2007, published in the United States as Someone Knows My Name).  It is inspired by the African Americans who were resettled in Nova Scotia, and some of them who later chose to go to Sierra Leone, where they created a colony of freedmen in Africa. He features Aminata Diallo, a young African woman captured as a child; she is literate and acts as a scribe to record the information about the former slaves. The book won the top 2008 Commonwealth Writers' Prize.

Canadian director Clement Virgo adapted the book into a six-hour television mini-series of the same title. The series premiered on CBC in Canada on 7 January 2015 and on BET in the United States on 16 February 2015 and starred Aunjanue Ellis, Lyriq Bent, Cuba Gooding Jr. and Louis Gossett Jr.

See also 
Black Nova Scotians
Rough Crossings (subtitle: Britain, the Slaves and the American Revolution), a history book and television series by Simon Schama

Notes

External links
"The Book of Negroes", African Nova Scotians: in the Age of Slavery and Abolition, Nova Scotia Archives
"Book of Negroes", Remembering Black Loyalists, Black Communities in Nova Scotia, 2001, Noval Scotia Museum
Cassandra Pybus, Epic Journeys of Freedom: Runaway Slaves of the American Revolution and Their Global Quest for Liberty (Boston: Beacon Press, 2006).
Black Loyalists: Our History, Our People, Canadian Digital Collections, website includes link to Book of Negroes
African Nova Scotians in the Age of Slavery and Abolition (Digitized version of the British copy)
Inspection Roll of Negroes Book No. 2 (Digitized version of the American copy.) 
Carleton Papers – Book of Negroes, 1783 (Library and Archives Canada). Searchable database of the Book of Negroes.
Hodges, Graham R. The Black Loyalist Directory: African Americans in Exile After the American Revolution. New York: Garland Pub. in association with the New England Historic Genealogical Society, 1996. Print version of the American copy.

1783 documents
African-American documents
African-American slave records
African-American genealogy
Black Loyalists
History of Black people in Canada
Sierra Leone Creole history books
Krio genealogy
Collection of The National Archives (United Kingdom)
Fugitive American slaves
American expatriates in Canada